Anobrium oberthueri is a species of beetle in the family Cerambycidae. It was described by Belon in 1902. It is known from Ecuador, Bolivia and Brazil.

References

Pteropliini
Beetles described in 1902